Olympique de Marseille won Division 1 season 1991/1992 of the French Association Football League with 58 points.

Participating teams

 Auxerre
 SM Caen
 AS Cannes
 Le Havre AC
 Lens
 Lille
 Olympique Lyonnais
 Olympique Marseille
 FC Metz
 AS Monaco
 Montpellier HSC
 AS Nancy
 FC Nantes Atlantique
 Nîmes Olympique
 Paris Saint-Germain FC
 Stade Rennais
 AS Saint-Etienne
 FC Sochaux-Montbéliard
 Sporting Toulon Var
 Toulouse FC

League table

Results

Relegation play-offs

|}

Top goalscorers

Olympique de Marseille Winning Squad 1991–'92

Goal Keeper

 Pascal Olmeta

Defence
 Manuel Amoros
 Jocelyn Angloma
 Pascal Baills
 Basile Boli
 Bernard Casoni
 Marcel Desailly
 Eric Di Meco
 Carlos Mozer

Midfield
 Alain Boghossian
 Didier Deschamps
 Jean-Philippe Durand
 Patrice Eyraud
 Jean-Christophe Marquet
 Franck Sauzée
 Trevor Steven
 Dragan Stojkovic (on loan)

Attack
 Marc Libbra
 Jean-Pierre Papin
 Abedi Pele
 Chris Waddle
 Daniel Xuereb

Management
 Tomislav Ivic, later   Raymond Goethals(Coach)

References

Ligue 1 seasons
France
1